Yarmouk Stadium is an association football stadium in Gaza City on the Gaza Strip. Yarmouk Stadium is one of the oldest Palestinian stadiums. It was opened in 1952 under Egyptian rule and was restored recently under the direct supervision of the Municipality of Gaza. It is the home stadium of the Gaza Sports Club. The stadium seats 9,000 spectators.

References

Football venues in the State of Palestine
Athletics (track and field) venues in the State of Palestine
Buildings and structures in Gaza City
Sport in the Gaza Strip